This article describes the group stage of the 2015–16 Women's EHF Champions League.

Format
In each group, teams played against each other in a double round-robin format, with home and away matches. After completion of the group stage matches, the top three teams of each group advanced to the main round.

Tiebreakers
In the group stage, teams are ranked according to points (2 points for a win, 1 point for a draw, 0 points for a loss). After completion of the group stage, if two or more teams have scored the same number of points, the ranking will be determined as follows (article 4.3.1, section II of regulations):

Highest number of points in matches between the teams directly involved;
Superior goal difference in matches between the teams directly involved;
Highest number of goals scored in matches between the teams directly involved (or in the away match in case of a two-team tie);
Superior goal difference in all matches of the group;
Highest number of plus goals in all matches of the group;
If the ranking of one of these teams is determined, the above criteria are consecutively followed until the ranking of all teams is determined. If no ranking can be determined, the following criteria apply:
Drawing of lots.

During the group stage, only criteria 1, 4 and 5 apply to determine the provisional ranking of teams.

Seedings
The seedings were announced on 23 June 2015. The draw was held on 26 June 2015.

Notes

Groups

Group A

Group B

Notes

Group C

Group D

References

External links
Official website

2015–16 Women's EHF Champions League